Kazuhiro Iwatani (born 8 June 1964) is a Japanese equestrian. He competed at the 1988 Summer Olympics, the 1992 Summer Olympics and the 1996 Summer Olympics.

References

1964 births
Living people
Japanese male equestrians
Olympic equestrians of Japan
Equestrians at the 1988 Summer Olympics
Equestrians at the 1992 Summer Olympics
Equestrians at the 1996 Summer Olympics
Sportspeople from Kyoto